Alessandro, Principe Ruspoli (January 14, 1869 – September 28, 1952), Grand Master of the Sacred Apostolic Hospice,  was the 7th Principe di Cerveteri, 7th Marchese di Riano, 12th Conte di Vignanello and Prince of the Holy Roman Empire, son of Francesco Maria Ruspoli, 6th Prince of Cerveteri and wife Egle dei Conti Franchesi.

Marriage and children 
He married in Rome, July 5, 1897 Marianita dei Duchi Lante Montefeltro della Rovere (Rome, May 30, 1873 – Rome, February 22, 1971), granddaughter of wealthy Americans, Ann and Thomas E. Davis from New York City, New York, by whom he had four children:

 Donna Giacinta dei Principi Ruspoli (Rome, April 11, 1898 – Rome, September 4, 1982), married firstly in Rome, April 30, 1919 Clemente dei Principi del Drago Marchese di Rioffredo (Rome, September 9, 1897 – Rome, March 7, 1939), and had issue, and secondly in Rome, November 4, 1941 Conte Alvise Emo-Capodilista (Vicenza, July 17, 1898 – Rome, January 7, 1980), without issue
 Francesco Ruspoli, 8th Prince of Cerveteri
 Donna Egle dei Principi Ruspoli (Rome, April 21, 1902 – Rome, July 3, 2000), married in Rome, April 28, 1924 Alessandro Federici, Marchese della Costa (Chieri, August 5, 1899 – Rome, March 16, 1989), and had issue
 Don Luigi dei Principi Ruspoli (Rome, March 14, 1908 –), married in Rome, April 23, 1938 Eleonora Berlingieri dei Marchesi di Valle Perrotta (Rome, August 25, 1913 – Rome, October, 1989), and had two sons:
 Don Giulio dei Principi Ruspoli (Rome, September 23, 1939 –), married firstly in Rome, June 2, 1974 Paola Murri, without issue, and secondly Patrizia Memmo, without issue
 Don Pietro dei Principi Ruspoli (Rome, October 27, 1940 –), married at Cerveteri, October 3, 1970 Letizia Ciancarelli, and had a daughter and a son:
 Donna Marianita dei Principi Ruspoli (1976/1977 –), married at the Villa Papale della Suvera, near Siena, September 23, 2006 Luca Pirri Ardizzone (Milan, April 18, 1973 –)
 Don Alessandro dei Principi Ruspoli (1980); married 20 June 2015 Guja Randaccio dei conti del Timavo

See also 
 Ruspoli

References

External links 
 Alessandro Ruspoli on a genealogical site

1869 births
1952 deaths
Alessandro
Alessandro